Strážce plamene v obrazech (The Flamekeeper in Pictures) is a video album by Czech recording artists Petr Hapka and Michal Horáček, released on Universal Music in 2007.

Track listing

Credits and personnel
 Michal Horáček - lyrics, producer
 Petr Hapka - music, producer, lead vocal

 Michal Pekárek - producer, remix, engineer, mastering
 Daniel Závorka - executive producer
 Jaromír Pesr - director
 Jan Budař - director
 Tomáš Hodan - director
 Jakub Sommer - director
 Cyril Podolský - director
 Martin Dolenský - director
 Mirjam Landa - director
 Ondřej Beránek - director, producer

 Otakar Vávra - director
 Lukáš Záhoř - producer
 Jaromír Nohavica - lead vocal
 Jana Kirschner - lead vocal
 Daniel Landa - lead vocal
 Bára Basiková - lead vocal
 Hana Hegerová - lead vocal
 František Segrado - lead vocal
 Szidi Tobias - lead vocal
 Mona Martinů - photography

Charts

See also
 Strážce plamene (CD release)

References

External links 
MichalHoracek.cz > Discography > Strážce plamene v obrazech
Petr Hapka & Michal Horáček on Euro Pop Music

2007 video albums